Platydoris striata is a species of sea slug, a dorid nudibranch, shell-less marine opisthobranch gastropod mollusks in the family Discodorididae.

Distribution
This species was described from Sri Lanka (Ceylon). It is reported from the Red Sea and the Indian Ocean.

References

Discodorididae
Gastropods described in 1858